Buffalo Pass, elevation , is a mountain pass that crosses the Continental Divide in the Park Range of the Rocky Mountains of northern Colorado in the United States.

See also

Southern Rocky Mountains
Park Range
Colorado mountain passes

References

External links

Landforms of Jackson County, Colorado
Landforms of Routt County, Colorado
Mountain passes of Colorado
Great Divide of North America